Arm's Way is the second studio album by Montreal-based indie rock band Islands. It was released on May 20, 2008, on CD and download. The album's title is a play on the words "harm's way". The album leaked online on April 11, 2008.

Concept and production 
Drummer Aaron Harris outlined the album's concept and the band's songwriting approach thus:  We took a different approach with this album in that the music is focused on the band members – there are not any special appearances. Arm's was conceived in Montreal, we wrote the songs in a room with old NOFX and Insane Clown Posse posters on the wall. As a band we put the music together and then singer Nick Thorburn wrote the lyrics.

Music 
The musical style of Arm's Way represents a departure from the Graceland-inspired sound of debut album Return to the Sea. Rebecca Raber of Pitchfork writes, "Gone are the guest rappers, the acoustic nuevo-country twang, and the sunny Afro-Caribbean flourishes ... In their place are theatrical string arrangements, layers of silvery, minor-key guitars, and lots of gothy synthesizers." Most lyrics include references to death and violence, themes which are shared with frontman Nick Thorburn's previous project The Unicorns.

Track listing

Personnel 
Adapted from AllMusic.
 Patrice Agbokou – bass
 Rebecca Bird – artwork
 Doug Boehm – mixing
 Greg Calbi – mastering
 Alex Chow – percussion, synthesizer, viola, violin
 Sebastian Chow – oboe, piano, violin, vocals
 Chris Constable – mixing assistant
 Corn Gangg – drum programming
 Steve Fallone – mastering
 Patrick Gregoire – bass clarinet, guitar
 Ryan Hadlock – engineer, producer
 Aaron Harris – drums, percussion, vocals
 Islands – arranger, primary artist, producer
 Mathieu Roberge – assistant engineer
 Rob Schnapf – mixing
 Nick Thorburn – guitar, vocals
 Alexander Wagner – photography

References 

2008 albums
Anti- (record label) albums
Islands (band) albums
Albums recorded at Bear Creek Studio